Fernando de Oliveira can refer to:
Fernão de Oliveira (1507–1581), Portuguese grammarian and humanist
Fernando Oliveira (b. 1984), Brazilian footballer